The 1973 Aryamehr Cup was a men's professional tennis tournament played on outdoor clay courts at the Imperial Country Club in Tehran in Iran. The event was part of the 1973 Commercial Union Assurance Grand Prix as a Group A category event. It was the second edition of the tournament was held from 22 October through 28 October 1973. Raúl Ramírez won the singles title and the trophy and first–prize cheque for $9,000 was presented by Shah Mohammad Reza Pahlavi.

Finals

Singles
 Raúl Ramírez defeated  John Newcombe 6–7, 6–1, 7–5, 6–3
 It was Ramírez' 2nd title of the year and his 2nd career title.

Doubles
 Rod Laver /  John Newcombe defeated  Ross Case /  Geoff Masters 7–6, 6–2

References

External links
 ITF tournament edition details

Aryamehr Cup
1973 Grand Prix (tennis)